Shoestring is a British detective fiction drama series, set in an unnamed city in the West of England and filmed in Bristol, featuring the down-at-heel private detective Eddie Shoestring (Trevor Eve), who presents his own show on Radio West, a local radio station. Broadcast on BBC1, the programme lasted for two series, between 30 September 1979 and 21 December 1980, featuring a total of 21 episodes. After the second series was broadcast Eve decided not to return to the role, as he "wanted to diversify into theatre roles". Subsequently, the production team began taking popular elements of the series and revising them for a new series, Bergerac, set in Jersey and first shown in 1981. BBC Books published two novels written by Paul Ableman, Shoestring (1979) and Shoestring's Finest Hour (1980).

Shoestring was repeated on terrestrial television in January 2002, with 14 of the 21 episodes being shown airing back to back on daytime BBC One. However, due to scheduling, between six and eight minutes of footage was cut from every episode.

The first series was originally scheduled to be released on DVD in its entirety by DD Home Entertainment in 2005, but the idea was abandoned because of the high cost of music rights licensing. In 2011 2|Entertain confirmed that it had picked up the rights to release the series on DVD and announced that the first series would be released on 17 October 2011. They announced that all 11 episodes would be uncut except for one minor music replacement, meaning that it would be the first time the series had been seen uncut since UK Gold repeats of the series in the early 1990s. This DVD was later deleted.

In June 2017, Network Distribution announced that a DVD box set of both series was planned for release on 16 October 2017 and would contain a book on the series written by Andrew Pixley.

Synopsis 
Eddie Shoestring is a former computer expert who has resigned after suffering a nervous breakdown. In those days computers were large bulky machines with open reel tape drives creating considerable noise. In one episode Shoestring visits such a computer room and finds it mentally distressing. Following a period of convalescence, Shoestring has turned his hand to private detective work. His landlady, barrister Erica Bayliss, arranges for him to investigate a potential scandal involving an entertainer who works for the local Radio West.

After sorting the matter out, Shoestring visits Radio West to brief his client who has just chaired an unsuccessful planning meeting to come up with new programme ideas. Inspired by a sketch of herself made by Shoestring, Radio West's receptionist Sonia proposes that he is hired as the station's "private ear" to present a weekly broadcast entitled 'The Private Ear of Eddie Shoestring', in which members of the public are offered his services in order to investigate cases affecting them, such as disappearances or the unsolved deaths of loved ones. At first, Shoestring drives an old Hillman Hunter, but when this is destroyed, he purchases a bright orange Ford Cortina estate. The final episode was a Christmas special. The episode "Find The Lady" featured singer Toyah Willcox and allowed her to perform some of her own material in character. The building used to portray the Radio West premises is actually a multi storey car park between Queen Charlotte Street and Welsh Back.

Almost a year after the show finished, Bristol's first independent radio station was started under the name of Radio West on 27 October 1981. In 2022, Shoestring was the subject of 'Eddie Shoestring's Bristol', a documentary presented by Xander Brett for Burst Radio.

Cast 
 Trevor Eve as Eddie Shoestring – A "Private Ear" for Radio West, who investigates cases for the public free of charge. He is sometimes called "Bootlace", and is nearly always scruffy and dishevelled in his appearance.
 Michael Medwin as Don Satchley – The owner of Radio West. He sometimes finds that Shoestring's cases conflict with his commercial interests.
 Doran Godwin as Erica Bayliss – Shoestring's landlady. As a barrister, she sometimes provides legal advice for the cases he is investigating. There are also some hints of a romance between the pair.
 Liz Crowther as Sonia – The receptionist at Radio West.

Supporting cast
 Colin Maitland as Pete – A sound engineer and studio assistant at Radio West (eight episodes)
 Jeanna L'Etsy as Liz (four episodes)
 Julian Littman as Vincent Dinsdale (four episodes)
 John Vine as Karl Winning – A DJ and announcer at Radio West (three episodes)
 Stewart Bevan as Paul – A DJ and presenter at Radio West (three episodes)
 Alan David as Ben Fischer (two episodes)
 Toyah Wilcox as Toola (one episode, December 1979)

Episodes

Series 1 (1979)

Series 2 (1980)

References

External links

Unofficial fansite
Interview with Series Dubbing Mixer

1979 British television series debuts
1980 British television series endings
1970s British drama television series
1980s British drama television series
1970s British crime television series
1980s British crime television series
1970s British mystery television series
1980s British mystery television series
Television shows set in Bristol
Television shows shot in Bristol
Fictional private investigators
BBC mystery television shows
English-language television shows
Television series by BBC Studios